The 1988 Honda Classic was a women's tennis tournament played on outdoor hard courts at the San Juan Central Park in San Juan in Puerto Rico and was part of the Category 1 tier of the 1988 WTA Tour. The tournament ran from October 10 through October 16, 1988. Fourth-seeded Anne Minter won the singles title and earned $12,000 first-prize money.

Finals

Singles

 Anne Minter defeated  Mercedes Paz 2–6, 6–4, 6–3
 It was Minter's only singles title of the year and the 3rd of her career.

Doubles

 Patty Fendick /  Jill Hetherington defeated  Gigi Fernández /  Robin White 6–4, 6–2
 It was Fendick's 8th title of the year and the 8th of her career. It was Hetherington's 6th title of the year and the 7th of her career.

References

External links
 ITF tournament edition details
 Tournament draws

Honda Classic
Puerto Rico Open (tennis)